The "Sans Day Carol", also known as "St. Day Carol" and "The Holly Bears a Berry", is a traditional Cornish Christmas carol named after the Cornish village of St Day, where it was found around the turn of the twentieth century. The song, which is listed as no. 35 in the Oxford Book of Carols, is very closely related to the more famous carol "The Holly and the Ivy". According to the Roud Folk Song Index, the "Sans Day Carol" and "The Holly and the Ivy" are variants of the same song (Roud 514).

Origin 
The carol and its melody were first collected and transcribed by Gilbert Hunter Doble from the singing of  W.D. Watson of Penzance, Cornwall, the Borough of Penzance's Head Gardener. Watson had learned the song in the early 1900s from a man aged around fifty or sixty years named Thomas Beard, a villager in St Day in the parish of Gwennap, Cornwall. In the early 1930s, the American folklorist James Madison Carpenter recorded W.D. Watson singing the song on wax cylinder; the recording can be heard online via the Vaughan Williams Memorial Library.

W.D. Watson translated the song into Cornish, which he thought had been the original language of the song, and added a fourth verse. After learning the song from W.D. Watson in English, Doble arranged the carol, altering it slightly, and publishing it in 1929. The fourth verse published by Doble is a translation of the "Ma gron war'n gelln" verse written by Watson.

Text
The most common and earliest used text for this carol is as follows:

1. Now the holly bears a berry as white as the milk,
And Mary bore Jesus, who was wrapped up in silk:

Chorus: And Mary bore Jesus Christ our Saviour for to be,
And the first tree in the greenwood, it was the holly.
Holly! Holly!
And the first tree in the greenwood, it was the holly!

2. Now the holly bears a berry as green as the grass,
And Mary bore Jesus, who died on the cross:

Chorus

3. Now the holly bears a berry as black as the coal,
And Mary bore Jesus, who died for us all:

Chorus

4. Now the holly bears a berry, as blood is it red,
Then trust we our Saviour, who rose from the dead:

Chorus

"When the Angel Came to Mary" 
British hymnodist Michael Perry composed the text "When the Angel Came to Mary" which is also sung to the Sans Day Carol.

Recorded versions 
 1965 - The Watersons - Frost and Fire: A Calendar of Ceremonial Folk Songs
 1976 - Philip Ledger and the King's College Choir - Carols for Christmas Eve
 1988 - Rita MacNeil - Now the Bells Ring
 1991 - The Chieftains - The Bells of Dublin
 1993 - John Rutter and the Cambridge Singers - Christmas Day in the Morning
 1998 - David Hill and the Choir of Winchester Cathedral - O Come Let Us Adore Him: Christmas Carols from Winchester Cathedral
 1996 - Sue White - Best of Cornish Folksongs, Vols I & II
 2004 - Cherish the Ladies - On Christmas Night
 2006 - Maddy Prior - An Evening of Carols and Capers
 2007 - Chris Squire - Chris Squire's Swiss Choir
 2008 - Nidarosdomens Guttekor(Nidaros Cathedral Boys' Choir) - I Wish
 2009 - Belshazzar's Feast (Paul Sartin and Paul Hutchinson)- "Frost Bites"
 2011 - Sandy Denny, Patsy and Alex Campbell  - 19 Rupert St  (recorded 1967)
 2011 - Kate Rusby - While Mortals Sleep
 2020 - Burd Ellen - Says the Never Beyond

See also
 List of Christmas carols

References

External links 
Audio file the St Day Carol

Christmas carols
Cornish music
19th-century songs
Year of song unknown